Czechoslovakia competed at the 1968 Winter Olympics in Grenoble, France.

Medalists

Alpine skiing

Men

Men's slalom

Women

Biathlon

Men

 1 One minute added per close miss (a hit in the outer ring), two minutes added per complete miss.

Cross-country skiing

Men

Men's 4 × 10 km relay

Figure skating

Men

Women

Pairs

Ice hockey

Medal Round 

 Czechoslovakia –  USA 5:1  (1:1, 2:0, 2:0)  
Goalscorers: Suchý, Havel, Jiřík, Hejma, Jiří Holík – Volmar.
Referees: Dahlberg, Wiking (SWE)

 Czechoslovakia –  West Germany  5:1  (1:0, 2:0, 2:1)  
Goalscorers: Hrbatý, Golonka, Havel, Hejma, Ševčík – Lax. 
Referees: Kubinec, McEvoy (CAN)

  Czechoslovakia –  Finland 4:3  (0:1, 3:0, 1:2) 
Goalscorers: Nedomanský 2, Golonka, Havel – Keinonen, Ketola, Oksanen.
Referees: Wiking (SWE), Snětkov (URS)

 Czechoslovakia –  East Germany 10:3  (5:2, 1:0, 4:1)  
Goalscorers: Horešovský 4, Nedomanský 2, Jiřík, Suchý, Kochta, Ševčík – Karrenbauer, Novy, Peters. 
Referees: Dahlberg (SWE), Sillankorva (FIN)

  Czechoslovakia –  Canada  2:3  (0:0, 0:3, 2:0) 
Goalscorers: Havel, Nedomanský – Huck, Bourbonnais, Cadieux. 
Referees: Trumble (USA), Sillankorva (FIN)

 Czechoslovakia –  USSR 5:4  (3:1, 1:1, 1:2)  
Goalscorers: Ševčík, Hejma, Havel, Golonka, Jiřík – Majorov 2, Blinov, Populanov.
Referees: Trumble (USA), Dahlberg (SWE)

 Czechoslovakia –   Sweden  2:2  (1:1, 1:0, 0:1) 
Goalscorers: Golonka, Hrbatý – Bengtsson, Henriksson.
Referees: Trumble (USA), Sillankorva (FIN)

Leading scorers/Awards

IIHF Award:

 CZECHOSLOVAKIA
Goaltenders: Vladimír Nadrchal, Vladimír Dzurilla.
Defence: Josef Horešovský, Jan Suchý, Karel Masopust, František Pospíšil, Oldřich Machač.
Forwards: Jozef Golonka, Jan Hrbatý, Václav Nedomanský, Jan Havel, Jaroslav Jiřík, Josef Černý, František Ševčík, Petr Hejma, Jiří Holík, Jiří Kochta, Jan Klapáč.
Coaches: Jaroslav Pitner, Vladimír Kostka.

Luge

Men

(Men's) Doubles

Women

Nordic combined 

Events:
 normal hill ski jumping 
 15 km cross-country skiing

Ski jumping

References
Official Olympic Reports
International Olympic Committee results database
 Olympic Winter Games 1968, full results by sports-reference.com

Nations at the 1968 Winter Olympics
1968
Winter Olympics